Calcutta State Transport Corporation  (CSTC) was a West Bengal state government undertaken transport corporation. Headquartered in Kolkata, it was set up on 31 July 1948. Currently it operates under the name WBTC. It plied buses in Kolkata and nearby districts of West Bengal, along with some long-distance services. CSTC owned 11 depots in Kolkata and the districts to station its fleet of busses.

History 

Calcutta State Transport Corporation started its journey on 31 July 1948 as State Transport Services with an objective to provide efficient, adequate, economical and properly coordinated passenger bus service particularly in and around the city of Kolkata and in the state of West Bengal in general.

On 15 June 1960 the name of State Transport Service has changed to Calcutta State Transport Corporation (CSTC) under the Road Transport Corporation Act, 1950. By 1966, it had upgraded its services and was connected to 90 percent of the national highways. To fulfill the demand of rural passengers, CSTC introduced one of the earliest Long Distance Bus Services (LDS) from Calcutta to Digha in April 1968.

Merger with WBTC

In 2017, the Department of Transport (West Bengal), under Transport Minister Protik Bhattacharya merged CSTC with other transport providers such as CTC and WBSTC and to form WBTC.

Operations

Fleet
With a fleet of 782 buses, CSTC was able to set up a number of bus routes in the southern part of West Bengal which were till then not connected to any other means of transport. CSTC also pioneered the running of air-conditioned Volvo buses in Kolkata, replacing the aging fleet.

Air conditioned buses were launched in July 2014 on 40 routes across the city and suburbs. They were in blue and white livery, the buses included a complete fleet of Volvo 8400 units as well as JanBus models from Ashok Leyland, the first low floor front entry public buses in the country. These were bought under the central JNNURM scheme.

In 2019, the West Bengal state government made a decision to transition the city's bus fleet, along with its ferry fleet, to be entirely electric by 2030, to reduce the levels of air pollution in the city.

Routes

Depots
Former CSTC Depots used for parking and repairing buses.

1 Belghoria Depot (Head Office) (BD)
2 Garia Depot (GD)
3 Howrah Depot (HD)
4 Kasba Depot (KD)
5 Lake Depot (LD)
6 Maniktala Depot (MD)
7 Nilgunge Depot (ND)
8 Paikpara Depot (PD)
9 Salt Lake Depot (SLD)
10 Taratala Depot (TD)
11 Thakurpukur Depot (TPD)
12 Pride Plaza Depot (PRD)

References

External links
 Official website

State agencies of West Bengal
Transport in Kolkata
Bus companies of India
Organizations established in 1948
State road transport corporations of India
Metropolitan transport agencies of India
Indian companies established in 1948
1948 establishments in West Bengal